Alexandre Gustave Daniel Chantelat (17 April 1871 – 13 March 1936) was a French fencer. He competed in the men's masters sabre event at the 1900 Summer Olympics.

References

External links
 

1871 births
1936 deaths
French male sabre fencers
Olympic fencers of France
Fencers at the 1900 Summer Olympics
Sportspeople from Cher (department)
Place of death missing